Cetopsidium ferreirai is a species of whale catfish endemic to Brazil where it is found in the Trombetas River, a tributary of the lower Amazon River.

References 
 

Cetopsidae
Fish of South America
Fish of Brazil
Endemic fauna of Brazil
Fish described in 2005